The Pennsylvania Railroad's N1s was a class of steam locomotive built for Lines West.  They were of 2-10-2 "Santa Fe" wheel arrangement, ten driving wheels with a two-wheel leading truck and a two-wheel cast KW-pattern trailing truck under a giant firebox.  This arrangement was well suited to the N1s' intended purpose, which was as a heavy drag freight engine for coal and iron ore traffic to and from lakeside ports. The design was developed by the PRR's Fort Wayne Shops and orders were placed with Alco (Brooks) (35 locomotives) and Baldwin (25 locomotives) for a total of 60; the first Alco locomotive was delivered in December 1918, with the remainder arriving during 1919.

No feedwater heater was fitted, but a mechanical stoker and power reverse were, necessities on such a large locomotive.

To allow the locomotive to negotiate tight 23-degree curves, the first and fifth driving axles were fitted with lateral motion devices and the center axle was blind.  

In many respects, the N1s was similar in ability to the I1s 2-10-0 "Decapod". Driver diameter, weight on drivers and cylinder size were almost identical. The N1s' boiler was larger, but of a lower pressure. The I1s' tractive effort was a little higher, while the N1s had a superior factor of adhesion.

The N1s were the first class of large power withdrawn after diesel locomotives appeared; all were gone by 1950, and none were saved for display.  Their task, low-speed drag haulage, was the diesel locomotive's forte.

References

ALCO locomotives
Baldwin locomotives
2-10-2 locomotives
N1s
Steam locomotives of the United States
Scrapped locomotives
Freight locomotives
Standard gauge locomotives of the United States